The Laurel Futurity is an American Thoroughbred horse race held annually in late September at Laurel Park Racecourse in Laurel, Maryland. Run over a distance of  miles on turf, at one time it was a Grade I stakes race on dirt, and one of the richest and most important races for two-year-old American thoroughbreds. When the race was moved from the dirt to the turf in 2005, it lost its graded status and was subsequently ineligible for grading in 2006. The race was finally cancelled in 2008 for economic reasons. It was announced by Laurel Park that the famed race would be restored in 2011 and run on October 8 at 6 furlongs.

Originally known as the Pimlico Futurity (the race began at Pimlico Race Course in 1921, only moving to Laurel in 1969 where it was briefly known as the Pimlico-Laurel Futurity). Past winners include Triple Crown champions Count Fleet, Citation, Secretariat and Affirmed, who defeated his arch rival Alydar in this race.

Records 

Speed record: 
  miles – 1:40.17 – Barbaro (2005)
  miles – 1:49.35 – Scottish Halo (1999)
 1 mile – 1:39.00 – High Strung (1928)
  furlongs – 1:30.70 – Appealing Skier (1995)

Most wins by an owner:
 4 – Greentree Stable (1927, 1948, 1950, 1982)

Most wins by a jockey:
 3 – Edgar Prado    (1994, 1998, 2007)
 3 – Bill Shoemaker    (1957, 1958, 1961)
 3 – Douglas Dodson    (1944, 1947, 1954)
 3 – John Gilbert    (1932, 1940, 1946)
 3 – Albert Johnson    (1921, 1922, 1923)

Most wins by a trainer:
 3 – George M. Odom  (1924, 1928, 1955)

Winners

 ‡ In 2005, the race was switched to the turf.
 † Fathers Image finished 1st in 1965 but was disqualified.
 † Privileged won in 1936 but was disqualified for interference and set back to last.
 # The race was run in two divisions in 1922.

See also 
 Laurel Futurity Stakes top three finishers

References

External links
Barbaro's win in the 2005 Laurel Futurity
Video at YouTube of Affirmed and Alydar in the 1977 Laurel Futurity
Morvich and the first Pimlico (Laurel) Futurity
Morvich: Autobiography of a Horse in the Internet Archive

Horse races in Maryland
Laurel Park Racecourse
Flat horse races for two-year-olds
Turf races in the United States
Previously graded stakes races in the United States
Recurring sporting events established in 1921
1921 establishments in Maryland